David Henry Chase (born August 22, 1945) is an American filmmaker. He wrote and produced the HBO drama The Sopranos which aired for six seasons between 1999 and 2007. Chase has also produced and written for such shows as The Rockford Files, I'll Fly Away, and Northern Exposure. He created the original series Almost Grown which aired for 10 episodes in 1988 and 1989. He has won seven Emmy Awards. Chase's film debut came in 2012 with Not Fade Away, followed by The Many Saints of Newark (2021), a prequel film to the TV series The Sopranos.

Early life and education
Chase was born into a working-class Italian American family in Mount Vernon, New York, the only child of Henry and Norma Chase. His paternal grandmother had changed the family name from "DeCesare" to "Chase". His father owned a hardware store. He grew up in a small garden apartment in Clifton, New Jersey, and in North Caldwell, New Jersey. He grew up watching matinée crime films and was well known as a creative storyteller.

He has stated that he had many problems with his parents when he was a child. He says that his father was an angry man who belittled him constantly, and his mother was a "passive-aggressive drama queen" and a "nervous woman who dominated any situation she was in by being so needy and always on the verge of hysteria." A character he created for The Sopranos, Livia Soprano, is based on his mother.

Chase struggled with panic attacks and clinical depression as a teenager, something he dealt with into adulthood. He graduated from high school in 1964 and attended Wake Forest University in Winston-Salem, North Carolina, where his depression worsened. "I slept 18 hours a day," he has stated. He described his problems as "normal, nagging, clinical depression." He also worked as a drummer during this period and aspired to be a professional musician. After two years, he transferred to New York University where he chose to pursue a career in film—a decision that was not well received by his parents. He went on to attend Stanford University's School of Film, earning a Master of Arts degree in 1971.

Career
Chase started in Hollywood as a story editor for Kolchak: The Night Stalker and then produced episodes of The Rockford Files and Northern Exposure, among other series. He also worked as a writer of 19 episodes while on The Rockford Files—a show which he worked on in various capacities for more than four years. He won several Emmy awards, including one for a television movie, Off the Minnesota Strip, the story of a runaway he scripted in 1980. His first original created series was Almost Grown in 1988, with Eve Gordon and Timothy Daly. Although the one-hour series was well received by critics, only 10 episodes aired from November 1988 to February 1989.

The Sopranos
Chase worked in relative anonymity before The Sopranos debuted. The story of The Sopranos was initially conceived as a feature film about "a mobster in therapy having problems with his mother". Chase got some input from his manager Lloyd Braun and decided to adapt it into a television series. He signed a development deal in 1995 with production company Brillstein-Grey and wrote the original pilot script. He drew heavily from his personal life and his experiences growing up in New Jersey, and has stated that he tried to apply his own "family dynamic to mobsters". For instance, the tumultuous relationship between series protagonist Tony Soprano and his mother Livia is partially based on Chase's relationship with his own mother. He was also in psychotherapy at the time and modeled the character of Jennifer Melfi after his own psychiatrist.

Chase had been fascinated by organized crime and the mafia from an early age, witnessing such people growing up. He also was raised on classic gangster films such as The Public Enemy and the crime series The Untouchables. The series is partly inspired by the Richard Boiardo family, a prominent New Jersey organized crime family when Chase was growing up, and partly on New Jersey's DeCavalcante family. He has mentioned American playwrights Arthur Miller and Tennessee Williams as influences on the show's writing, and Italian director Federico Fellini as an important influence on the show's cinematic style.
The series was named after high school friends of his.

Chase and producer Brad Grey pitched The Sopranos to several networks; Fox showed interest but passed on it after Chase presented them the pilot script. They eventually pitched the show to Chris Albrecht, president of HBO Original Programming, who decided to finance a pilot episode which was shot in 1997.
Chase directed it himself. They finished the pilot and showed it to HBO executives, but the show was put on hold for several months. During this time, Chase, who had long experienced frustration at being unable to break out of TV and into film, considered asking HBO for additional funding to shoot 45 more minutes of footage and release The Sopranos as a feature film. In December 1997, HBO decided to produce the series and ordered 12 more episodes for a 13-episode season.
The show premiered on HBO on January 10, 1999, with the pilot, The Sopranos.

Thirty episodes of The Sopranos are explicitly credited to Chase; however, as the show's creator, showrunner, and head writer, he had a major role in all the scripts, including producing and touching up each script's final draft. He also directed the pilot episode and the series finale (both of which he also wrote).

Of the controversial final scene of the series finale, Chase said, "I have no interest in explaining, defending, reinterpreting, or adding to what is there." But in 2022, he did just that; David Chase and Phil Abrham created a 2022 Super Bowl spot for Commonwealth / McCann with two characters from the show who appear in a 2021 New York City/New Jersey setting.

Not Fade Away
Not Fade Away (2012), Chase's feature film debut, was released on December 21, 2012. It centers on the lead singer of a teenage rock 'n' roll band (played by John Magaro) in 1960s New Jersey. Described as "a music-driven coming-of-age story," the film reunites Chase with James Gandolfini (former star of Sopranos), who co-stars as Magaro's father. Other cast members include Bella Heathcote, Christopher McDonald, Molly Price, Lisa Lampanelli, Jack Huston and Brad Garrett. Chase himself has described the film as about "a post-war, post-Depression-era parent who has given his kid every advantage that he didn't have growing up, but now can't help feeling jealous of the liberated, more adventurous destiny his son is able to enjoy." Another former Sopranos cast member, Steven Van Zandt, served as music supervisor and executive producer.

The Many Saints of Newark
Although Chase was "against [the movie] for a long time", Deadline Hollywood reported in March 2018 that New Line Cinema had purchased the script for The Many Saints of Newark, a prequel to The Sopranos written by Chase and fellow screenwriter Lawrence Konner. Chase said of the storyline, which centers on the 1967 Newark riots and racial tensions between the Italian-American and African-American communities, "I was interested in Newark and life in Newark at that time... I used to go down there every Saturday night for dinner with my grandparents. But the thing that interested me most was Tony's boyhood. I was interested in exploring that." Chase served as producer, and in July 2018, Alan Taylor, who previously directed episodes of the series, was hired to direct the film. The film was initially scheduled to be released on September 25, 2020, however, due to the COVID-19 pandemic in the United States, its release date was rescheduled to March 12, 2021 and later September 24, 2021 before ultimately being released on October 1, 2021.

More recently, he and his Chase Films production company struck a deal with WarnerMedia.

Unrealized projects

A Ribbon of Dreams
Chase has previously developed A Ribbon of Dreams, a miniseries for HBO. According to an HBO press release, the series' pilot would "begin in 1913 and follow two men, one a college-educated mechanical engineer, the other a cowboy with a violent past, who form an unlikely producing partnership and together become pioneers and then powers for a time in motion pictures." Specifically, the two men would "begin as employees of D.W. Griffith, and then cross career paths with John Ford, John Wayne, Raoul Walsh, Bette Davis, Billy Wilder and others who gave shape to Hollywood as it grew from the age of rough-hewn silent Westerns, to the golden era of talkies and the studio system, to the auteur movement, to television, and finally to the present day." In 2021, Chase revealed that HBO agreed to proceed with the production of the miniseries but with "a cheesy budget", to which Chase refused to agree. Therefore, Chase and HBO parted ways on the project and A Ribbon of Dreams fell through. In March 2023, it was announced the series is back in development at FX.

Personal life
After graduating from NYU in 1968, Chase moved to California and married his high school sweetheart Denise Kelly. He is the father of actress Michele DeCesare, who appeared in six The Sopranos episodes as Hunter Scangarelo.

Chase once stated that he "loathed and despised" television shows, watching only The Sopranos and movies. However, he said in later interviews that he watched Boardwalk Empire and Mad Men, the work of former Sopranos writers and producers Terence Winter and Matthew Weiner, respectively. He said that he previously made those negative comments in part because he had been frustrated working within the confines of 1990s network television.

Select filmography

Television

Film

Other credits

Awards and recognition
1978 Emmy Award Winner, Outstanding Drama Series (The Rockford Files)
1979 Emmy Award Nomination, Outstanding Drama Series (The Rockford Files)
1980 Golden Globe Award Nomination, Best Television Series – Drama (The Rockford Files)
1980 Emmy Award Nomination, Outstanding Drama Series (The Rockford Files)
1980 Emmy Award Winner, Outstanding Writing in a Limited Series or a Special (Off The Minnesota Strip)
1992 Golden Globe Award Nomination, Best Television Series – Drama (I'll Fly Away)
1992 Emmy Award Nomination, Outstanding Drama Series (I'll Fly Away)
1992 Emmy Award Nomination, Outstanding Writing for A Drama Series (I'll Fly Away – "Pilot")
1993 Golden Globe Award Nomination, Best Television Series – Drama (I'll Fly Away)
1993 Emmy Award Nomination, Outstanding Drama Series (I'll Fly Away)
1994 Emmy Award Nomination, Outstanding Drama Series (Northern Exposure)
1999 Golden Globe Award Winner, Best Television Series – Drama (The Sopranos)
1999 Emmy Award Nomination, Outstanding Drama Series (The Sopranos)
1999 Emmy Award Winner, Outstanding Writing for A Drama Series (The Sopranos – "College")
1999 Emmy Award Nomination, Outstanding Writing for A Drama Series (The Sopranos – "Pilot")
1999 Emmy Award Nomination, Outstanding Directing for A Drama Series (The Sopranos – "Pilot")
2000 Emmy Award Nomination, Outstanding Drama Series (The Sopranos)
2001 Golden Globe Award Nomination, Best Television Series – Drama (The Sopranos)
2001 Emmy Award Nomination, Outstanding Writing for A Drama Series (The Sopranos – "Funhouse")
2001 Emmy Award Nomination, Outstanding Drama Series (The Sopranos)
2001 Emmy Award Nomination, Outstanding Writing for A Drama Series (The Sopranos – "Amour Fou")
2002 Golden Globe Award Nomination, Best Television Series – Drama (The Sopranos)
2003 Emmy Award Nomination, Outstanding Drama Series (The Sopranos)
2003 Emmy Award Winner, Outstanding Writing for A Drama Series (The Sopranos – "Whitecaps")
2004 Golden Globe Award Nomination, Best Television Series – Drama (The Sopranos)
2004 Emmy Award Winner, Outstanding Drama Series (The Sopranos)
2006 Emmy Award Nomination, Outstanding Drama Series (The Sopranos)
2007 Emmy Award Winner, Outstanding Drama Series (The Sopranos)
2007 Emmy Award Nomination, Outstanding Writing for A Drama Series (The Sopranos – "Kennedy and Heidi")
2007 Emmy Award Winner, Outstanding Writing for A Drama Series (The Sopranos – "Made in America")
2008 Laurel Award for TV Writing Achievement

References

External links
 
 

1945 births
Film producers from New York (state)
American male screenwriters
American television directors
Television producers from New York (state)
American television writers
Living people
New York University alumni
American writers of Italian descent
People from Clifton, New Jersey
Writers from Mount Vernon, New York
People from North Caldwell, New Jersey
Primetime Emmy Award winners
Showrunners
Directors Guild of America Award winners
Stanford University alumni
American male television writers
Film directors from New Jersey
Film directors from New York (state)
Screenwriters from New York (state)
Screenwriters from New Jersey
Film producers from New Jersey
Television producers from New Jersey
American people of Italian descent